Second grade (also called grade two, corresponding to Year 3 in the United Kingdom) is a year of primary education in Canada and the United States. Second grade is the second year of primary school. Children are usually aged 7–8 at this grade level.

Australia equivalent

In Australia, this level of class is called Year 2. Children generally start this level between the ages of seven and eight.

Brazil equivalent
In Brazil, second grade is the segundo ano do Ensino Fundamental I, in this case, the minimum age required to enter second grade is 7 years (84 months). To enter the second grade, all students must be 7 years old before the cut-off date.

Cameroon equivalent
In Cameroon, there are two sub-educational systems: one based on French education taught in French, and the other one based on British educational systems taught in English. This grade thus corresponds to "Class Two" in the English sub-educational system, and to the "Cours Preparatoire (CP)" of the French system.

France equivalent
In France, second grade corresponds to CE1 (Cours Élémentaire 1), the second of five years of elementary school.

India equivalent
In India, children enter Class 2 or 3 at ages 7 to 8.

Italy equivalent
In Italy, second grade corresponds to the second class of primary school (seconda classe della scuola primaria)

Germany equivalent
In Germany, second grade is comparable to second class (2.Klasse).

Greece equivalent
In Greece, the second school year of primary school is referred to as Second Grade of Primary (Deftera Dimotikou).

New Zealand equivalent
In New Zealand, this level of class is called Year 3.

Peru equivalent
In Peru, "second grade (Segundo Grado)" is the common term, with pupils between 7–8 years old.

Portugal equivalent
In Portugal, second grade (segundo ano, 2º ano) is the second of the four-year 1º Ciclo do Ensino Básico that also includes the first grade, the third grade, and the fourth grade.

Republic of Ireland equivalent
In The Republic of Ireland, the equivalent to second grade is known as "Second Class" (usually for 7–8 year olds), which is year 4 of primary school. It is traditionally the year that is dedicated to preparing for the child's "First Holy Communion"; however, as Ireland has become increasingly multicultural, more and more schools are opting to prepare for the sacrament outside of school hours.

United Kingdom equivalents
The British education system differs slightly between the four individual countries of the United Kingdom.

In England, the second year of school is called year 1, with pupils 5 to 6 years old. Second grade is the equivalent to Year 3 in England and Wales, making it the fourth year of compulsory education.  In Scottish and Welsh schools, contemporary pupils are in their third year of compulsory education; this level is their fourth year in Northern Ireland.

United States equivalents
In the United States, second grade students study arithmetic, working with multi-digit addition and subtraction of natural and whole numbers. They also study time and its division into AM and PM segments; fractions; rounding; and measurement. Usually, multiplication and division are introduced toward the end of the school year. Children usually turn 8 years old during the second grade academic year.

In language arts, students work with regular and irregular verbs, plurals, homophones, compound words, and comparative and superlative adjectives.

Natural science in the second grade includes basic physics like simple machines, magnets, and heat. Students learn about human anatomy, including the heart and digestive system. A basic understanding of the Earth and space is also taught, comprising such topics as basic astronomy, geology, paleontology, and meteorology. The science curriculum may vary by local school district.

Civics class includes topics relating to the presidents, the states, and capitals of the United States, as well as the Civil War and geography.

In popular culture
 Sune börjar tvåan, Anders Jacobsson and Sören Olsson, 1985

See also
 Educational stage
 Elementary schools in Japan

References

2
Primary education